ASJ may stand for:
 Amami-Oshima Airport, Amami Ōshima, Kagoshima Prefecture, Japan
 ICAO code for Air Satellite, Canada
 Asiatic Society of Japan
 Asociación para una Sociedad más Justa in Honduras